Amit Kumar Saroha (born 10324 January 1985) is a Paralympian, Asian Para Games medalist and an Arjuna Awardee, competing in the F51 category in Discus throw and Club throw. He is one of India's top Para athletes and the first quadriplegic to represent India at a Paralympic Games (London 2012). He trains at the Sports Authority of India in Sonipat and is being supported by the GoSports Foundation

Early life and background

Born in Haryana in 1985, Amit suffered a car accident when he was 22, causing him to become a quadriplegic due to compression of the spinal cord. Before his injury, Amit was a national level hockey player. However, his tryst with fame as a sportsperson happened after his injury when he met Jonathan Sigworth, an American wheelchair rugby player on a tour of India to promote para sports. Wheelchair rugby introduced Amit to the world of para sports and he joined Sigworth in promoting wheelchair rugby across India.

While playing in a demonstration match of wheelchair rugby with a Brazilian team, he met several para-athletes from across the world and learnt the official Paralympic nomenclature for his injury - F 51. Amit decided to take training in sports which require upper body strength and started competing in throw ball and discus throw; he has not looked back since.

Career

In 2010 Amit took part in his first Asian Para Games in Guangzhou, China, where he won a silver medal in Discus throw, one of only 14 other medals won by Indians. Two years later, Amit won a Gold medal in the Olympic qualifier event in Kuala Lumpur, Malaysia, breaking the Asian record along the way. This helped Amit rise to third in the world rankings, and also earned him his first Paralympic games qualification (London 2012). The following year, Amit was conferred the Arjuna Award by the President of India, in recognition of his outstanding sporting achievements.

At the 2014 Asian Para Games in Incheon, Korea, Amit won two medals for India; a Gold in Club throw with a distance of 21.31 m and a Silver in Discus throw with a distance of 9.89 m. His club throw distance was another Asian record, and the medal winning performance earned him an automatic qualification for Rio 2016.

Confident from his exploits at the 2014 Asian Para Games, Amit arrived at the 2015 World Championships in Doha, as one of the favorites. He lived up to his reputation, winning Silver medal in Club throw and bettering his previous Asian Games mark by over 4 metres to register a throw of 25.44 m. In 2017 World Parathletics Championship, he won Silver Medal setting new Asian record with a throw of 30.25m.

Apart from being an athlete, Amit is also a big promoter of the paralympic movement in the country. He is a motivational speaker for the youth and has been invited to speak across prestigious institutions like IIT Guwahati (Chief Guest) and BITS, Pilani.

References

Living people
1985 births
Indian male discus throwers
Male club throwers
Indian people with disabilities
Paralympic athletes of India
Athletes (track and field) at the 2012 Summer Paralympics
Athletes (track and field) at the 2016 Summer Paralympics
Recipients of the Arjuna Award
Athletes (track and field) at the 2020 Summer Paralympics
Wheelchair discus throwers
Paralympic club throwers
Paralympic discus throwers
Medalists at the World Para Athletics Championships
Medalists at the 2010 Asian Para Games
Medalists at the 2014 Asian Para Games
Medalists at the 2018 Asian Para Games